George Byers (June 25, 1872 – April 10, 1937) was a Canadian boxer who won the World Colored Middleweight Championship in 1897 and held the World Colored Heavyweight Championship from September 14, 1898, to March 16, 1901, a reign of 913 days. The 5′ 8½″  fought out of Boston from 1895 to 1904 at a weight of between 120 and 165 lbs., in many weight classes and frequently against men that were much larger than himself. On 9 December 1897 in Waterbury, Connecticut, he faced Harry Peppers in a title match for the World Colored Middleweight Championship.  Byers knocked out the undefeated Peppers, the Pacific Coast Middleweight Champion of the Pacific Coast in the 19th round of a 20-round contest. He took up US citizenship in 1917 (subscription required)

Rivalry With Frank Childs

Byers fought Frank Childs for the world colored heavyweight title on 14 September 1898 at the Lenox Athletic Club in New York City, winning on points in a 20-round bout. Childs continued to claim the title during Byers' reign, and fought former colored heavyweight champ Bob Armstrong on 4 March 1899 in Cincinnati, Ohio, in a fight announced as being for the title.

Byers next fought Childs, who was billing himself as the "black heavyweight title" holder, on 16 March at the Star Athletic Club in Chicago. Byers had put his colored heavyweight title on the line and emerged victorious, winning a decision in a six-round contest.

One year later, on 16 March 1901, Byers lost his title to Childs when the ex-champ KO-ed him in the 17th round of a 20-round title bout. They never fought again.

Record
Byers racked up a record of 20 wins (17 by knock out) against seven losses (knocked out four times) and 20 draws.

Legacy & Honors

In 2020 award-winning author Mark Allen Baker published the first comprehensive account of The World Colored Heavyweight Championship, 1876-1937, with McFarland & Company, a leading independent publisher of academic & nonfiction books. This history traces the advent and demise of the Championship, the stories of the talented professional athletes who won it, and the demarcation of the color line both in and out of the ring.

For decades the World Colored Heavyweight Championship was a useful tool to combat racial oppression-the existence of the title a leverage mechanism, or tool, used as a technique to counter a social element, “drawing the color line.”

Professional boxing record
All information in this section is derived from BoxRec, unless otherwise stated.

Official record

All newspaper decisions are officially regarded as “no decision” bouts and are not counted in the win/loss/draw column.

Unofficial record

Record with the inclusion of newspaper decisions in the win/loss/draw column.

References

1872 births
1937 deaths
Black Canadian boxers
Canadian male boxers
Heavyweight boxers
Sportspeople from Charlottetown
World colored heavyweight boxing champions
World colored middleweight boxing champions